Trapidil is a vasodilator and an antiplatelet drug. It also acts as an antagonist of platelet-derived growth factor.

An analog was assigned the codename AR 12-456.

References 

Vasodilators
Phosphodiesterase inhibitors
Triazolopyrimidines
Diethylamino compounds